Pao bergii is a species of pufferfish in the family Tetraodontidae. It is a tropical freshwater fish native to the Kapuas River drainage of Borneo in Indonesia.

References 

Tetraodontidae